Gamul Kebir or Gamul Kebeer is a dive location just off the Egyptian Safaga Island in the Red Sea.

References

External links
Gamul Kebir dive site

Underwater diving sites in Egypt
Red Sea